Shuanglong station is an interchange station for Line 3 and Line 16 of the Shenzhen Metro. Line 3 station is elevated, above Shenhui Road. Line 3 platform opened on 28 December 2010 and Line 16 platform opened on 28 December 2022.

Station layout

Exits

References

External links

 Shenzhen Metro Shuanglong Station (Chinese)
 Shenzhen Metro Shuanglong Station (English)

Railway stations in Guangdong
Shenzhen Metro stations
Longgang District, Shenzhen
Railway stations in China opened in 2010